Thierry Larchier d'Hirson or d'Hireçon, or de Hérisson, (1270 in Bourbonnais – 23 August 1328) was a French cleric under Robert II, Count of Artois.

Hirson was employed by Philip IV of France on several occasions.  He became a canon of Arras in 1299; chancellor of Mahaut, Countess of Artois in 1303; provost of Aire-sur-la-Lys in 1309; and was appointed Bishop of Arras in April 1328. He died on 23 August 1328.

Hirson was involved with Jeanne de Divion, who, in revenge for what she did not inherit upon the bishop's death, procured false documents for Robert III of Artois so that he could recover the County of Artois, which had been bestowed upon his great aunt Mahaut, Countess of Artois, in a legal dispute.

Family
Hirson's niece Béatrice d'Hirson was a lady-in-waiting to Mahaut, Countess of Artois, as was her sister Mathilde. His brothers were as follows:
 Denis d'Hirson, treasurer to the Countess of Artois, then lord of Arras
 Guillaume d'Hirson, bailiff of Arras
 Pierre d'Hirson, attendant to the Countess of Artois

In fiction
The dispute between Robert and Mahaut plays an important part in Maurice Druon's series of French historical novels, Les Rois maudits (The Accursed Kings).

External links
 

1270 births
1328 deaths
Bishops of Arras